Mammillaria standleyi is a species of the family Cactaceae native to the Sierra Madre Occidental of Sinaloa, Chihuahua and Sonora. It has red-purple flowers surrounded by cottony pubescence. Fruits are red and edible, tasting like apples, although too small to be of much food value to humans.

Synonyms
 Mammillaria standleyi (Britt. & Rose) Orcutt, Cactography 8. 1926
 Neomammillaria standleyi Britt. & Rose, Cact. 4: 97. 1923.
 Mammillaria auricantha R.T. Craig, Mammill. Handbook 301, fig. 272. 1945.
 Mammillaria auritricha R.T. Craig, Mammill. Handbook 302, fig. 273. 1945
 Mammillaria laneusumma R.T. Craig, Mammill. Handbook 310, fig. 282. 1945
 Mammillaria mayensis R.T. Craig, Mammill. Handbook 116, fig. 97. 1945
 Mammillaria montensis R.T. Craig, Mammill. Handbook 311, fig. 284. 1945.
 Mammillaria craigii  G.E. Linds., Cact. Succ. J. (Los Angeles) 303. 1942.
 Mammillaria sonorensis Craig,  Cact. Succ. J. (US) 12(10): 155. 1940.
 Mammillaria sonorensis var brevispina Craig, Cact. Succ. J. (Los Angeles) 12: 156, fig 1940
 Mammillaria sonorensis var gentryi Craig, Cact. Succ. J. (Los Angeles) 12: 156, fig 1940
 Mammillaria sonorensis var hiltonii Craig, Cact. Succ. J. (Los Angeles) 12: 156, fig 1940
 Mammillaria sonorensis var longispina Craig, Cact. Succ. J. (Los Angeles) 12: 156, fig 1940
 Mammillaria sonorensis var maccartyi Craig, Cact. Succ. J. (Los Angeles) 12: 156, fig 1940
 Mammillaria tesopacensis  Craig, Mammill. Handbook 104, fig. 86. 1945
 Mammillaria xanthina (Britton & Rose) Boed., Mammillarien-Vergleichs-Schluessel 47. 1933.
 Neomammillaria xanthina  Britton & Rose, Cactaceae (Britton & Rose) 4: 164. 1923 
 Chilita xanthina (Britton & Rose) Orcutt, Cactography 2. 1926.
 Mammillaria bellisiana Craig, Mammill. Handb. 304 (1945)
 Mammillaria movensis Craig, Mammill. Handb. 312, fig. 285 1945 
 Mammillaria tinuvieliae Laferr., J. Mammillaria Soc. 38(2): 21, fig. 1998
 Mammillaria floresii Fritz Schwarz, Blätt. Sukkulentenk. 1: 5. 1949.

References

standleyi
Cacti of Mexico
Flora of Chihuahua (state)
Flora of Sinaloa
Flora of Sonora